Cannomois grandis is a species of rush-like flowering plant in the genus Cannomois, native to the Cape Provinces of South Africa. It has gained the Royal Horticultural Society's Award of Garden Merit as an ornamental.

References

Restionaceae
Endemic flora of South Africa
Plants described in 2011